Władysław Filar (18 July 1926 – 13 August 2019) was a Polish historian, academic and a soldier of the 27th Home Army Infantry Division.

Filar was born in Iwanicze Nowe in Volhynia, Poland (now Ukraine). During the Second World War, he fought against the Germans in Volhynia in Operation Tempest, and defended Polish villages against the Ukrainian Insurgent Army.

In 1956, he completed the Academy of General Staff and in 1963 received a doctorate in Military History. He habilitated in 1970 and became associate professor in 1973. He authored up to 120 historical and military publications. Filar also organized a series of historical seminars: "Poland - Ukraine: difficult questions" (1996–2001).

Filar latterly served as the Vice-chairman of Volhynia County, World Union of Home Army. He died in Warsaw on 13 August 2019, at the age of 93.

Awards and decorations
 Cross of Valour
 Partisan Cross
 Polish Army Medal, three times
 Home Army Cross

Books
 Przed Akcją Wisła był Wołyń, książka pod redakcją Władysława Filara, Wydawnictwo: Światowy Związek Żołnierzy Armii Krajowej, 1997. 
 Wołyń 1939-1944. Eksterminacja, czy walki polsko-ukraińskie, Wydawnictwo Adam Marszałek, 2003. 
 Przebraże bastion polskiej samoobrony na Wołyniu, Rytm Oficyna Wydawnicza, 2007. 
 Wydarzenia wołyńskie 1939-1944. W poszukiwaniu odpowiedzi na trudne pytania, Wydawnictwo Adam Marszałek, 2008. 
 "Burza" na Wołyniu". Z dziejów 27 Wołyńskiej Dywizji Piechoty Armii Krajowej. Studium historyczno-wojskowe, Oficyna Wydawnicza RYTM i ROPWiM, Warszawa 1997.

References

Sources
 Publishing house Adam Marszałek, (In Polish)

1926 births
2019 deaths
People from Volyn Oblast
20th-century Polish historians
Polish male non-fiction writers
Home Army members
Recipients of the Cross of Valour (Poland)
Recipients of the Polish Army Medal
Recipients of the Armia Krajowa Cross